San Joaquín District is one of the 20 districts of Caaguazú Department, Paraguay.